Roberto Junguito Bonnet  (1943 – 27 December 2020) was a Colombian politician and economist who served as Minister of Agriculture and Rural Development and Minister of Finance and Public Credit.

References

1943 births
2020 deaths
Colombian politicians
Ministers of Finance and Public Credit of Colombia
Colombian economists